Michael Margolin is an American former tennis player.

Margolin, a left-hander, was a collegiate tennis player for the USC Trojans in the early 1970s. He is the brother of tennis player Stacy Margolin, who he partnered with in mixed doubles at three US Open tournaments. Michael Margolin won his first local Pickleball tournament at the 4.0 level in Bend, Oregon in 2022. Margolin resides in Bend where he plays Tennis, Pickleball and bikes regularly.

In 1999 he was appointed head tennis coach at Beverly Hills High School, of which he is a graduate.

References

External links
 

Year of birth missing (living people)
Living people
American male tennis players
Tennis people from California
USC Trojans men's tennis players
Beverly Hills High School alumni